Dimitry Imbongo (born 28 March 1990) is a Congolese professional footballer who plays as a forward for German club Alemannia Aachen.

Career
On 16 July 2012, Imbongo signed a contract with the New England Revolution of Major League Soccer.

References

External links 
 
 

1990 births
Living people
Footballers from Kinshasa
Democratic Republic of the Congo footballers
Association football forwards
TSV 1860 Munich II players
SV Darmstadt 98 players
LASK players
FC Wacker Innsbruck (2002) players
Alemannia Aachen players
SG Sonnenhof Großaspach players
New England Revolution players
FC Lahti players
Barakaldo CF footballers
SC Fortuna Köln players
Major League Soccer players
3. Liga players
Regionalliga players
2. Liga (Austria) players
Austrian Regionalliga players
Veikkausliiga players
Segunda División B players
French expatriate footballers
Democratic Republic of the Congo expatriate sportspeople in Germany
Expatriate footballers in Germany
Democratic Republic of the Congo expatriate sportspeople in the United States
Expatriate soccer players in the United States
Expatriate footballers in Austria
Democratic Republic of the Congo expatriate sportspeople in Spain
Expatriate footballers in Spain
Expatriate footballers in Finland
21st-century Democratic Republic of the Congo people
Democratic Republic of the Congo expatriate sportspeople in Austria
Democratic Republic of the Congo expatriate sportspeople in Finland
People from Nanterre
Democratic Republic of the Congo emigrants to France
Footballers from Hauts-de-Seine
Black French sportspeople
French expatriate sportspeople in Spain
French expatriate sportspeople in the United States
French expatriate sportspeople in Austria
French expatriate sportspeople in Germany
French expatriate sportspeople in Finland